WHEF is the World Hindu Economic Forum, a not for profile organization based out of Delhi, Bharat.

WHEF(S) may also refer to:

WHEF AM, radio station which broadcast James Blackwood
White Helmets Europe Foundation (WHEF), patronised by Massimo Taccon
Whefs, on List of file systems